Faqir Mosque is an oblong six-domed Islamic place of worship in Bangladesh's Chittagong District. The fifteenth-century mosque dates back to the Bengal Sultanate period.

Location
It is located in the Chittagong District's Hathazari Upazila, specifically in the Mouza of Dewannagar.

History
There is a broken inscription found in the premises which states that the mosque was constructed during the reign of the Sultan of Bengal Shamsuddin Yusuf Shah (1474-1481 CE). The mosque was supposedly abandoned for decades, hidden behind the dense bushes and jungle forestry. A faqir by the name of Sufi Muqim Shah was said to have rediscovered it and more worshippers started using the mosque. Muqim Shah's tomb is located adjacent to the mosque, and the mosque came to be known as Fakir Mosque.

Moulvi Hamidullah Khan mentioned this mosque in his Aḥādīth al-Khawānīn (1853). Historian Abdul Karim also gave a description of the mosque and it's inscription. The mosque was renovated from 1993 to 1994.

Description
The double-aisle mosque measures 14.63m x 10.66m on the outside and 11.65m x 7.54m on the inside. On its four corners are four conjoined minarets and the central Mihrab in a half-height adjoining tower cell. All the towers or minarets of the mosque are octagonal in shape, which rise above the roof and are covered with a small dome. The east wall has three very low and pointed exterior arches. The prayer hall is divided into three courtyards by two pillars. The central mihrab is larger than the other two side mihrabs. Its niche is adorned with chains and bell motifs.

References

Hathazari Upazila
15th-century mosques
Bengal Sultanate mosques
Historic sites in Bangladesh